There are 30 stadiums in use by High-A Minor League Baseball teams. The Midwest League and South Atlantic League each uses 12, and the Northwest League uses six. The oldest stadium is McCormick Field (1924) in Asheville, North Carolina, home of the South Atlantic League's Asheville Tourists. The newest stadium is ABC Supply Stadium in Beloit, Wisconsin, home of the Midwest League's Beloit Snappers. One stadium was built in each of the 1920s, 1930s, and 1940s, two in the 1950s, one in the 1980s, seven in the 1990s, 14 in the 2000s, two in the 2010s, and one in the 2020s. The highest seating capacity is 11,000 at Jackson Field in Lansing, Michigan, where the Midwest League's Lansing Lugnuts play. The lowest capacity is 3,654 at Gesa Stadium in Pasco, Washington, where the Northwest League's Tri-City Dust Devils play.

Stadiums

Midwest League

Northwest League

South Atlantic League

Map

Gallery

Midwest League

Northwest League

South Atlantic League

See also

List of Major League Baseball stadiums
List of Triple-A baseball stadiums
List of Double-A baseball stadiums
List of Single-A baseball stadiums

References

General reference

Minor league baseball venues
High-A
High-A baseball stadiums